Angkor Airways Corporation is a defunct airline that was based in Phnom Penh, Cambodia. This carrier started service in 2004 and had been substantially invested by Taiwan's Far Eastern Air Transport (FAT) as its subsidiary to make use of the Angkor International Airport in Siem Reap as its hub and as a fast transit station between Taiwan and People's Republic of China (where direct flights between the two locations were previously banned due to the political status of Taiwan), while meantime also operated some charter flights in the East Asia and Southeast Asia region. All its fleets were wet leased from the FAT.

Following a chain of financial crises of its parent FAT, on May 9, 2008 the airline ceased all operations due to financial issues.

Destinations

East Asia

Chengdu (Chengdu Shuangliu International Airport)
Kunming (Kunming Wujiaba International Airport)
Taipei (Taiwan Taoyuan International Airport)
Kaohsiung (Kaohsiung International Airport)

Tokyo (Narita International Airport) - charter
Nagoya (Chūbu Centrair International Airport) - charter
Niigata (Niigata Airport) - charter
Osaka  (Kansai International Airport) - charter
Fukuoka (Fukuoka Airport) - charter

Southeast Asia

Phnom Penh (Phnom Penh International Airport) - main hub
Siem Reap (Angkor International Airport) - focus city

Fleet
The Angkor Airlines fleet included the following aircraft (at April 2008):

1 Boeing 757-200 (which is leased from Far Eastern Air Transport)
1 McDonnell Douglas MD-83 (which is leased from Far Eastern Air Transport)

References

Defunct airlines of Cambodia
Airlines established in 2004
Airlines disestablished in 2008
Cambodian companies established in 2004